When P.W. Botha first became Prime Minister of South Africa in 1981, he appointed members of the National Party to positions in his first Cabinet.

Cabinet

References

Government of South Africa
Executive branch of the government of South Africa
Cabinets of South Africa
1981 establishments in South Africa
1987 disestablishments in South Africa
Cabinets established in 1981
Cabinets disestablished in 1987